Rambert Dumarest (17 September 1750, Saint-Étienne - 4 April 1806, Paris) was a French engraver and medallist.

Life and work 
He was the son of an arquebusier. After starting as a draftsman, he became a gun engraver at the Manufacture d'armes de Saint-Étienne, where he engraved crossguards and flintlocks. He also spent two years at the new Soho Manufactory, in England.

Upon returning to Paris, he devoted himself to goldsmithing and jewellery, although he is best remembered for his medals. In 1800, he was elected to the Institut de France. Three years later, as a member of the Académie des Beaux-Arts, he became the first occupant of Seat #3 for engraving. 

In 1795, he won the grand prize in a medal competition, for his profile of Jean-Jacques Rousseau. He also created notable medals for the  Banque de France, the Sénat conservateur, and the Institut de France.

References

Further reading 
 Charles Paul Landon, "Rambert Dumarest", In: Salon de 1808. Recueil de pièces choisies parmi les ouvrages de peinture…, 1808 (Online).

External links 

 Biographical data and references from the Comité des travaux historiques et scientifiques @ La France Savante



1750 births
1806 deaths
French engravers
French medallists
Members of the Académie des beaux-arts
Artists from Saint-Étienne